Børning is a 2014 Norwegian action-comedy film directed by Hallvard Bræin, produced by Filmkameratene.

Anders Baasmo Christiansen plays the main character Roy, a man who gets dragged into the biggest illegal car race in Norwegian history. The journey goes through Norway from Oslo to the North Cape. Roy drives a 1967 Ford Mustang fastback with a 302 BOSS engine. The car is called 'Lillegul' (Norwegian for "little yellow"), named after his daughter who had jaundice as an infant.

According to Norwegian media, the movie is a Norwegian reboot of the American Fast & Furious film series. Two sequels, Børning 2 and Børning 3 – Asphalt Burning were released in 2016 and in 2020 respectively.

All through the action scenes, there are no signs of violence in the film, and it's therefore got no age restriction. The two sequels have an age restriction of 6 years.

The movie premiered on the 14 August 2014. The script was written by Linn-Jeanette Kyed, following a story by Christopher Grøndahl, based on an idea by Hallvard Bræin.

Plot 
Roy is a car enthusiast well into his 30s. He only cares about running his company "Stallion Parts" and working on his beloved Ford Mustang "Lillegul", which he drag races occasionally. His daughter Nina lives with her mother in a good bourgeois environment - far from Roy's world.

The conflict starts when Nina out of nowhere shows up to spend her summer vacation with Roy. He can't remember agreeing to take care of her for the summer. The only thing marked in his calendar is the car drag race "Street legal".

During the prize ceremony after the race, where Roy as the favourite surprisingly did not win due to engine trouble, he is challenged by his arch-enemy TT to an illegal street race to Sinsen. To end the teasing, Roy agrees to race, as long as the race goes from Oslo to North Cape. There will only be two rules: 1) First to arrive Nordkapp has won, and 2) There are no other rules (except that you can not drive through Sweden).

Cast

Reception

Box office 
Børning was successful in the Norwegian box office, and in 2014 became the most viewed Norwegian movie, and the second most viewed movie of the year with over 380,000 viewers. The production company executed a well-planned release campaign through using social media, involving the cast, and contacts in the local car communities. The movie had a lot of publicity for a long time through social media, press and advertising.

Critical reception 

Børning received mixed to positive reviews from critics.

Aksel Kielland described the film as a formulaic and fundamentally unambitious film that doesn't quite reach up, but which just fully possesses a level of charm rarely seen in Norwegian films of this type. He confessed that he rather prefers Børning to the film with the most in common of the year, namely Scott Waugh's Need for Speed, which premiered in March 2014. At the premiere, he rated the film 4/6, but in a later comment said he would rate it 3/6 after having some days to think about the movie.

"Børning manifests itself to be Norway's first real car movie, and it kicks off with great force. The great interaction between the people in front and behind of the camera helps lift the film to reach the level it deserves" is the words of the film reviewer Fredrik Olsen Hagstrøm at Kinomagasinet. He praises the combination of scenic locations, great sound design and a lot of funny comments throughout the movie.

Accolades 
Børning has won 4 out of 6 Amanda Award nominations, and 1 out of 2 Kanonprisen award nominations.

Sequels 
Børning 2 was announced in November 2015, with production start February 2016. After two years in prison for participating in the illegal street race to Nordkapp, Roy finally gets out of prison. He is invited to a new illegal street race, this time during the winter, going from Bergen to Murmansk in the north of Russia, but he declines. That is until he hears that his daughter will be attending the race together with her boyfriend. The premiere was on 12 October 2016, and it was the most successful premiere weekend of the year in Norway, with over 212,000 viewers in five days. Børning 2 was the third most seen film in 2016 in Norwegian box offices with over 438,000 viewers. The movie has an approximate total budget of $2,500,000.

Børning 3 was announced in February 2018, and is set to premiere on 12 August 2020. In Børning 3, the journey goes to Germany, ending in a wild race on the world known racing track Nürburgring. The movie has an approximate total budget of $6,000,000.

Swedish Remake 
Director Edward af Sillén's film Ett sista race (2023) is an adaptation of Børning, based on the Norwegian film, but rewritten for the Swedish audience, starring Malin Akerman and David Hellenius.

References

External links 
 
 Børning - on Cineuropa.org
 "Børning - Behind the scenes video material"—SF Studio Norge YouTube channel

2014 films
Norwegian auto racing films
Norwegian action films
Reboot films
Fast & Furious mass media